Sebastien De Meulemeester (born 27 February 1998) is a Belgian freestyle swimmer. He competed in the men's 100 metre freestyle event at the 2020 European Aquatics Championships, in Budapest, Hungary.

References

External links
 

1998 births
Living people
Belgian male freestyle swimmers
Place of birth missing (living people)